

Events

Pre-1600
 324 – Battle of Adrianople: Constantine I defeats Licinius, who flees to Byzantium. 
 987 – Hugh Capet is crowned King of France, the first of the Capetian dynasty that would rule France until the French Revolution in 1792.
1035 – William the Conqueror becomes the Duke of Normandy, reigns until 1087.

1601–1900
1608 – Québec City is founded by Samuel de Champlain.
1754 – French and Indian War: George Washington surrenders Fort Necessity to French forces.
1767 – Pitcairn Island is discovered by Midshipman Robert Pitcairn on an expeditionary voyage commanded by Philip Carteret.
  1767   – Norway's oldest newspaper still in print, Adresseavisen, is founded and the first edition is published.
1775 – American Revolutionary War: George Washington takes command of the Continental Army at Cambridge, Massachusetts.
1778 – American Revolutionary War: Iroquois allied to Britain kill 360 people in the Wyoming Valley massacre.
1819 – The Bank for Savings in the City of New-York, the first savings bank in the United States, opens.
1839 – The first state normal school in the United States, the forerunner to today's Framingham State University, opens in Lexington, Massachusetts with three students.
1848 – Governor-General Peter von Scholten emancipates all remaining slaves in the Danish West Indies.
1849 – France invades the Roman Republic and restores the Papal States.
1852 – Congress establishes the United States' 2nd mint in San Francisco.
1863 – American Civil War: The final day of the Battle of Gettysburg culminates with Pickett's Charge.
1866 – Austro-Prussian War is decided at the Battle of Königgrätz, enabling Prussia to exclude Austria from German affairs.
1884 – Dow Jones & Company publishes its first stock average.
1886 – Karl Benz officially unveils the Benz Patent-Motorwagen, the first purpose-built automobile.
  1886   – The New-York Tribune becomes the first newspaper to use a linotype machine, eliminating typesetting by hand.
1890 – Idaho is admitted as the 43rd U.S. state.
1898 – A Spanish squadron, led by Pascual Cervera y Topete, is defeated by an American squadron under William T. Sampson in the Battle of Santiago de Cuba.

1901–present
1913 – Confederate veterans at the Great Reunion of 1913 reenact Pickett's Charge; upon reaching the high-water mark of the Confederacy they are met by the outstretched hands of friendship from Union survivors.
  1938   – United States President Franklin D. Roosevelt dedicates the Eternal Light Peace Memorial and lights the eternal flame at Gettysburg Battlefield.
1940 – World War II: The Royal Navy attacks the French naval squadron in Algeria, to ensure that it will not fall under German control. Of the four French battleships present, one is sunk, two are damaged, and one escapes back to France.
1944 – World War II: The Minsk Offensive clears German troops from the city. 
1952 – The Constitution of Puerto Rico is approved by the United States Congress.
  1952   – The  sets sail on her maiden voyage to Southampton.
1967 – The Aden Emergency: The Battle of the Crater in which the British Argyll and Sutherland Highlanders retake the Crater district following the Arab Police mutiny.
1970 – The Troubles: The "Falls Curfew" begins in Belfast, Northern Ireland.
  1970   – Dan-Air Flight 1903 crashes into the Les Agudes mountain in the Montseny Massif near the village of Arbúcies in Catalonia, Spain, killing all 112 people aboard.
 1973 – David Bowie retires his stage persona Ziggy Stardust with the surprise announcement that it is "the last show that we'll ever do" on the last day of the Ziggy Stardust Tour.
1979 – U.S. President Jimmy Carter signs the first directive for secret aid to the opponents of the pro-Soviet regime in Kabul.
1988 – United States Navy warship  shoots down Iran Air Flight 655 over the Persian Gulf, killing all 290 people aboard.
  1988   – The Fatih Sultan Mehmet Bridge in Istanbul, Turkey is completed, providing the second connection between the continents of Europe and Asia over the Bosphorus.
1996 – British Prime Minister John Major announced the Stone of Scone would be returned to Scotland.
2013 – Egyptian coup d'état: President of Egypt Mohamed Morsi is overthrown by the military after four days of protests all over the country calling for Morsi's resignation, to which he did not respond. President of the Supreme Constitutional Court of Egypt Adly Mansour is declared acting president.

Births

Pre-1600
 321 – Valentinian I, Roman emperor (d. 375)
1423 – Louis XI of France (d. 1483)
1442 – Emperor Go-Tsuchimikado of Japan (d. 1500)
1518 – Li Shizhen, Chinese physician and mineralogist (d. 1593)
1530 – Claude Fauchet, French historian and author (d. 1601)
1534 – Myeongjong of Joseon, Ruler of Korea (d. 1567)
1550 – Jacobus Gallus, Slovenian composer (d. 1591)
1569 – Thomas Richardson, English politician and judge (d. 1635)

1601–1900
1683 – Edward Young, English poet, dramatist and literary critic (Night-Thoughts) (d. 1765)
1685 – Sir Robert Rich, 4th Baronet, English field marshal and politician (d. 1768)
1728 – Robert Adam, Scottish-English architect, designed Culzean Castle (d. 1792)
1738 – John Singleton Copley, American painter (d. 1815)
1778 – Carl Ludvig Engel, German architect (d. 1840)
1789 – Johann Friedrich Overbeck, German-Italian painter and engraver (d. 1869)
1814 – Ferdinand Didrichsen, Danish botanist and physicist (d. 1887)
1823 – Ahmed Vefik Pasha, Greek-Ottoman statesman, diplomat, playwright, and translator (d. 1891)
1844 – Dankmar Adler, German-born American architect and engineer (d. 1900)
1846 – Achilles Alferaki, Russian composer and politician, Governor of Taganrog (d. 1919)
1851 – Charles Bannerman, English-Australian cricketer and umpire (d. 1930)
1854 – Leoš Janáček, Czech composer and theorist (d. 1928)
1860 – Charlotte Perkins Gilman, American sociologist and author (d. 1935)
1866 – Albert Gottschalk, Danish painter (d. 1906)
1869 – Svend Kornbeck, Danish actor (d. 1933)
1870 – R. B. Bennett, Canadian lawyer and politician, 11th Prime Minister of Canada (d. 1947)
1871 – William Henry Davies, Welsh poet and writer (d.1940)
1874 – Jean Collas, French rugby player and tug of war competitor (d. 1928)
1875 – Ferdinand Sauerbruch, German surgeon and academic (d. 1951)
1876 – Ralph Barton Perry, American philosopher and academic (d. 1957)
1878 – George M. Cohan, American songwriter, actor, singer, and dancer (d. 1942)
1879 – Alfred Korzybski, Polish-American mathematician, linguist, and philosopher (d. 1950)
1880 – Carl Schuricht, Polish-German conductor (d. 1967)
1883 – Franz Kafka, Czech-Austrian author (d. 1924)
1885 – Anna Dickie Olesen, American politician (d. 1971)
1886 – Raymond A. Spruance, American admiral and diplomat, United States Ambassador to the Philippines (d. 1969)
1888 – Ramón Gómez de la Serna, Spanish author and playwright (d. 1963)
1889 – Richard Cramer, American actor (d. 1960)
1893 – Sándor Bortnyik, Hungarian painter and graphic designer (d. 1976)
1896 – Doris Lloyd, English actress (d. 1968)
1897 – Jesse Douglas, American mathematician and academic (d. 1965)
1898 – Stefanos Stefanopoulos, Greek politician, Prime Minister of Greece (d. 1982)
1900 – Alessandro Blasetti, Italian director and screenwriter (d. 1987)

1901–present
1901 – Ruth Crawford Seeger, American composer (d. 1953)
1903 – Ace Bailey, Canadian ice hockey player and coach (d. 1992)
1905 – Johnny Gibson, American hurdler and coach (d. 2006)
1906 – George Sanders, Russian-born British actor (d. 1972)
1908 – M. F. K. Fisher, American author (d. 1992)
  1908   – Robert B. Meyner, American lawyer and politician, 44th Governor of New Jersey (d. 1990)
1909 – Stavros Niarchos, Greek shipping magnate (d.1996)
1910 – Fritz Kasparek, Austrian mountaineer (d. 1954)
1911 – Joe Hardstaff Jr., English cricketer (d. 1990)
1913 – Dorothy Kilgallen, American journalist, actress, and author (d. 1965)
1916 – John Kundla, American basketball player and coach (d. 2017)
1917 – João Saldanha, Brazilian footballer, manager, and journalist (d. 1990)
1918 – S. V. Ranga Rao, Indian actor, director, and producer (d. 1974)
  1918   – Johnny Palmer, American golfer (d. 2006)
1919 – Cecil FitzMaurice, 8th Earl of Orkney (d. 1998)
  1919   – Gerald W. Thomas, American soldier and academic (d. 2013)
1920 – Eddy Paape, Belgian illustrator (d. 2012)
  1920   – Paul O'Dea, American baseball player and manager (d. 1978)
1921 – Flor María Chalbaud, First Lady of Venezuela (d. 2013)
  1921   – Susan Peters, American actress (d. 1952)
  1921   – François Reichenbach, French director, producer, and screenwriter (d. 1993)
1922 – Guillaume Cornelis van Beverloo, Belgian painter and sculptor (d. 2010) 
  1922   – Theo Brokmann Jr., Dutch football player (d. 2003)
1924 – Amalia Aguilar, Cuban-Mexican film actress and dancer (d. 2021)
  1924   – S. R. Nathan, 6th President of Singapore (d. 2016)
1925 – Terry Moriarty, Australian rules footballer (d. 2011)
  1925   – Danny Nardico, American professional boxer (d. 2010)
  1925   – Philip Jamison, American artist (d. 2021)
1926 – Johnny Coles, American trumpet player (d. 1997)
  1926   – Rae Allen, American actress, singer, and director (d. 2022)
  1926   – Laurence Street, Australian jurist and former Chief Justice of the Supreme Court of New South Wales (d. 2018)
1927 – Ken Russell, English actor, director, and producer (d. 2011)
  1927   – Tim O'Connor, American actor (d. 2018)
1928 – Evelyn Anthony, English author (d. 2018)
1929 – Clément Perron, Canadian director, producer, and screenwriter (d. 1999)
  1929   – Joanne Herring, American socialite, businesswoman, political activist, philanthropist, diplomat, and television talk show host
1930 – Pete Fountain, American clarinet player (d. 2016)
  1930   – Carlos Kleiber, German-Austrian conductor (d. 2004)
  1930   – Tommy Tedesco, American guitarist (d. 1997)
1932 – Richard Mellon Scaife, American businessman (d. 2014)
1933 – Edward Brandt, Jr., American physician and mathematician (d. 2007)
1935 – Cheo Feliciano, Puerto Rican-American singer-songwriter (d. 2014)
  1935   – Harrison Schmitt, American geologist, astronaut, and politician
1936 – Anthony Lester, Baron Lester of Herne Hill, English lawyer and politician (d. 2020)
  1936   – Baard Owe, Norwegian-Danish actor (d. 2017)
1937 – Nicholas Maxwell, English philosopher and academic
  1937   – Tom Stoppard, Czech-English playwright and screenwriter
1938 – Jean Aitchison, English linguist and academic
  1938   – Sjaak Swart, Dutch footballer
1939 – Brigitte Fassbaender, German soprano and director
  1939   – László Kovács, Hungarian politician and diplomat, Hungarian Minister of Foreign Affairs
  1939   – Coco Laboy, Puerto Rican baseball player
1940 – Lamar Alexander, American lawyer and politician, 5th United States Secretary of Education
  1940   – Jerzy Buzek, Polish engineer and politician, 9th Prime Minister of Poland
  1940   – Lance Larson, American swimmer
  1940   – César Tovar, Venezuelan baseball player (d. 1994)
1941 – Gloria Allred, American lawyer and activist
  1941   – Liamine Zéroual, Algerian politician, 4th President of Algeria
1942 – Eddy Mitchell, French singer-songwriter 
1943 – Gary Waldhorn, British actor (d. 2022)
  1943   – Judith Durham, Australian folk-pop singer-songwriter and musician (d. 2022)
  1943   – Kurtwood Smith, American actor
  1943   – Norman E. Thagard, American astronaut
1945 – Michael Cole, American actor
  1945   – Michael Martin, Baron Martin of Springburn, Scottish politician, Speaker of the House of Commons (d. 2018)
  1946   – Johnny Lee, American singer and guitarist
  1946   – Leszek Miller, Polish political scientist and politician, 10th Prime Minister of Poland
  1946   – Michael Shea, American author (d. 2014)
1947 – Dave Barry, American journalist and author
  1947   – Betty Buckley, American actress and singer
  1947   – Mike Burton, American swimmer
1948 – Paul Barrere, American singer-songwriter and guitarist (d. 2019)
  1948   – Tarmo Koivisto, Finnish author and illustrator
1949 – Susan Penhaligon, English actress
  1949   – John Verity, English guitarist 
  1949   – Johnnie Wilder, Jr., American singer (d. 2006)
  1949   – Bo Xilai, Chinese politician, Chinese Minister of Commerce
1950 – Ewen Chatfield, New Zealand cricketer
  1950   – James Hahn, American judge and politician, 40th Mayor of Los Angeles
1951 – Jean-Claude Duvalier, Haitian politician, 41st President of Haiti (d. 2014)
  1951   – Richard Hadlee, New Zealand cricketer and footballer
1952 – Laura Branigan, American singer-songwriter (d. 2004)
  1952   – Lu Colombo, Italian singer
  1952   – Andy Fraser, English singer-songwriter and bass player (d. 2015)
  1952   – Carla Olson, American singer-songwriter and music producer
  1952   – Wasim Raja, Pakistani cricketer (d. 2006)
  1952   – Amit Kumar, Indian film playback singer, actor, director, music director and musician
1953 – Lotta Sollander, Swedish alpine skier
1954 – Les Cusworth, English rugby player
1955 – Claude Rajotte, Canadian radio and television host
1956 – Montel Williams, American talk show host and television personality
1957 – Poly Styrene, British musician (d. 2011)
1958 – Matthew Fraser, Canadian-English journalist and academic
  1958   – Charlie Higson, English actor, singer, and author 
  1958   – Siân Lloyd, Welsh meteorologist and journalist
  1958   – Didier Mouron, Swiss-Canadian painter
  1958   – Aaron Tippin, American singer-songwriter, guitarist, and producer
1959 – Julie Burchill, English journalist and author
  1959   – Ian Maxtone-Graham, American screenwriter and producer
  1959   – Stephen Pearcy, American singer-songwriter and guitarist 
  1959   – David Shore, Canadian screenwriter and producer
1960 – Vince Clarke, English singer-songwriter, keyboard player, and producer 
1962 – Scott Borchetta, American record executive and entrepreneur
  1962   – Tom Cruise, American actor and producer
  1962   – Thomas Gibson, American actor and director
1964 – Yeardley Smith, American actress, voice actress, comedian and writer
1965 – Shinya Hashimoto, Japanese wrestler (d. 2005)
  1965   – Connie Nielsen, Danish-American actress
  1965   – Komsan Pohkong, Thai lawyer and academic
  1965   – Christophe Ruer, French pentathlete (d. 2007)
1966 – Moisés Alou, American baseball player
1967 – Katy Clark, Scottish lawyer and politician
1968 – Ramush Haradinaj, Kosovo-Albanian soldier and politician, 4th Prime Minister of Kosovo
1970 – Serhiy Honchar, Ukrainian cyclist
  1970   – Audra McDonald, American actress and singer
  1970   – Teemu Selänne, Finnish ice hockey player
1971 – Julian Assange, Australian journalist, publisher, and activist, founded WikiLeaks
1973 – Paul Rauhihi, New Zealand rugby league player
  1973   – Ólafur Stefánsson, Icelandic handball player
  1973   – Fyodor Tuvin, Russian footballer (d. 2013)
1976 – Wade Belak, Canadian ice hockey player (d. 2011)
  1976   – Henry Olonga, Zimbabwean cricketer and sportscaster
  1976   – Wanderlei Silva, Brazilian-American mixed martial artist
  1976   – Bobby Skinstad, Zimbabwean-South African rugby union player
1977 – David Bowens, American football player
1978 – Mizuki Noguchi, Japanese runner
1979 – Jamie Grove, English cricketer
1980 – Mazharul Haque, Bangladeshi cricketer (d. 2013)
  1980   – Roland Schoeman, South African swimmer
  1980   – Harbhajan Singh, Indian cricketer
1983 – Edinson Vólquez, Dominican baseball player
1984 – Manny Lawson, American football player
  1984   – Churandy Martina, Dutch sprinter
  1984   – Corey Sevier, Canadian actor and producer
1986 – Marco Antônio de Mattos Filho, Brazilian footballer
  1986   – Kisenosato Yutaka, Japanese sumo wrestler
1987 – Sebastian Vettel, German race car driver
1988 – Winston Reid, New Zealand-Danish footballer
  1988   – Vladislav Sesganov, Russian figure skater
  1988   – James Troisi, Australian footballer 
1989 – Mitchell Dodds, Australian rugby league player
  1989   – Elle King, American singer, songwriter, and actress
  1990   – Nathan Gardner, Australian rugby league player
  1990   – Bobby Hopkinson, English footballer
  1990   – Lucas Mendes, Brazilian footballer
  1990 – Alison Riske-Amritraj, American tennis player
1991 – Alison Howie, Scottish field hockey player
  1991   – Anastasia Pavlyuchenkova, Russian tennis player
1992 – Crystal Dunn, American footballer
1999 – Nefisa Berberović, Bosnian tennis player

Deaths

Pre-1600
 458 – Anatolius of Constantinople, Byzantine patriarch and saint (b. 449)
 710 – Emperor Zhongzong of Tang (b. 656)
 896 – Dong Chang, Chinese warlord
 964 – Henry I, Frankish nobleman and archbishop
1090 – Egbert II, Margrave of Meissen (b. c. 1060)
1288 – Stephen de Fulbourn,  English-born Irish cleric and politician
1503 – Pierre d'Aubusson, Grand Master of the Knights of Rhodes (b. 1423)
1570 – Aonio Paleario, Italian academic and reformer (b. 1500)

1601–1900
1642 – Marie de' Medici, French queen consort and regent (b. 1573)
1672 – Francis Willughby, English ornithologist and ichthyologist (b. 1635)
1790 – Jean-Baptiste L. Romé de l'Isle, French geologist and mineralogist (b. 1736)
1795 – Louis-Georges de Bréquigny, French scholar and author (b. 1714)
  1795   – Antonio de Ulloa, Spanish general, astronomer, and politician, 1st Colonial Governor of Louisiana (b. 1716)
1809 – Joseph Quesnel, French-Canadian composer and playwright (b. 1746)
1863 – George Hull Ward, American general (b. 1826)
  1863   – Little Crow, American tribal leader (b. 1810)
1881 – Hasan Tahsini, Albanian astronomer, mathematician, and philosopher (b. 1811)
1887 – Clay Allison, American rancher (b. 1841)
1888 – Nguyễn Đình Chiểu, Vietnamese poet and author (b. 1822)

1901–present
1904 – Édouard Beaupré, Canadian giant and strongman (b. 1881)
  1904   – Theodor Herzl, Austrian journalist, playwright, and father of modern political Zionism (b. 1860)
1908 – Joel Chandler Harris, American journalist and author (b. 1845)
1916 – Hetty Green, American businesswoman and financier (b. 1834)
1918 – Mehmed V, Ottoman sultan (b. 1844)
1921 – James Mitchel, Irish-American weight thrower (b. 1864)
1927 – Gérard de Courcelles, French race car driver
1933 – Hipólito Yrigoyen, Argentinian educator and politician, 19th President of Argentina (b. 1852)
1935 – André Citroën, French engineer and businessman, founded the Citroën Company (b. 1878)
1937 – Jacob Schick, American-Canadian captain and businessman, invented the electric razor (b. 1877)
1941 – Friedrich Akel, Estonian physician and politician, Head of State of Estonia (b. 1871)
1954 – Siegfried Handloser, German physician and general (b. 1895)
  1954   – Reginald Marsh, French-American painter, illustrator, and academic (b. 1898)
1957 – Dolf Luque, Cuban baseball player and manager (b. 1890)
  1957   – Richard Mohaupt, German composer and Kapellmeister (b. 1904)
1958 – Charles Bathurst, 1st Viscount Bledisloe, English politician, 4th Governor-General of New Zealand (b. 1867)
1969 – Brian Jones, English guitarist, songwriter, and producer (b. 1942)
1971 – Jim Morrison, American singer-songwriter (b. 1943)
1974 – John Crowe Ransom, American poet and critic (b. 1888)
1977 – Alexander Volkov, Russian mathematician and author (b. 1891)
1978 – James Daly, American actor (b. 1918)
1979 – Louis Durey, French pianist and composer (b. 1888)
1981 – Ross Martin, American actor and director (b. 1920)
1985 – Frank J. Selke, Canadian ice hockey player and manager (b. 1893)
1986 – Rudy Vallée, American singer, saxophonist, and actor (b. 1901)
1989 – Jim Backus, American actor and voice artist (b. 1913)
1993 – Don Drysdale, American baseball player and sportscaster (b. 1936)
1994 – Lew Hoad, Australian tennis player and coach (b. 1934)
1995 – Pancho Gonzales, American tennis player (b. 1928)
  1995   – Eddie Mazur, Canadian ice hockey player (b. 1929)
1998 – Danielle Bunten Berry, American game designer and programmer (b. 1949)
1999 – Mark Sandman, American singer-songwriter, guitarist, and producer (b. 1952)
  1999   – Pelageya Polubarinova-Kochina, Russian mathematician (b. 1899)
2001 – Mordecai Richler, Canadian author and screenwriter (b. 1931)
  2001   – Johnny Russell, American singer-songwriter and guitarist (b. 1940)
2004 – Andriyan Nikolayev, Russian general, pilot, and astronaut (b. 1929)
2005 – Alberto Lattuada, Italian actor, director, and screenwriter (b. 1914)
  2005   – Gaylord Nelson, American lawyer and politician, 35th Governor of Wisconsin (b. 1916)
2006 – Joseph Goguen, American computer scientist, developed the OBJ programming language (b. 1941)
2007 – Boots Randolph, American saxophonist (b. 1927)
2008 – Clive Hornby, English actor and drummer (b. 1944)
  2008   – Oliver Schroer, Canadian fiddler, composer, and producer (b. 1956)
2009 – Alauddin Al-Azad, Bangladeshi author and poet (b.1932)
  2009   – John Keel, American journalist and author (b. 1930)
2010 – Abu Daoud, Palestinian terrorist, planned the Munich massacre (b. 1937)
2011 – Ali Bahar, Bahraini singer and guitarist (b. 1960) 
2012 – Nguyễn Hữu Có, Vietnamese general and politician (b. 1925)
  2012   – Andy Griffith, American actor, singer, and producer (b. 1926)
  2012   – Yvonne B. Miller, American educator and politician (b. 1934)
  2012   – Sergio Pininfarina, Italian engineer and politician (b. 1926)
  2012   – Richard Alvin Tonry, American lawyer and politician (b. 1935)
2013 – Roman Bengez, Slovenian footballer and manager (b. 1964)
  2013   – Francis Ray, American author (b. 1944)
  2013   – PJ Torokvei, Canadian actress and screenwriter (b. 1951)
  2013   – Radu Vasile, Romanian historian and politician, 57th Prime Minister of Romania (b. 1942)
  2013   – Bernard Vitet, French trumpet player and composer (b. 1934)
  2013   – Snoo Wilson, English playwright and screenwriter (b. 1948)
2014 – Jini Dellaccio, American photographer (b. 1917)
  2014   – Tim Flood, Irish hurler and coach (b. 1927)
  2014   – Volkmar Groß, German footballer (b. 1948)
  2014   – Ira Ruskin, American politician (b. 1943)
  2014   – Zalman Schachter-Shalomi, Ukrainian-American rabbi and author (b. 1924)
2015 – Diana Douglas, British-American actress (b. 1923)
  2015   – Boyd K. Packer, American religious leader and educator (b. 1924)
  2015   – Wayne Townsend, American farmer and politician (b. 1926) 
  2015   – Phil Walsh, Australian footballer and coach (b. 1960)
2020 – Saroj Khan, Indian dance choreographer (b. 1948)

Holidays and observances
 Christian feast day:
Anatolius of Constantinople
Anatolius of Laodicea
Dathus
Germanus of Man
Gurthiern
Heliodorus of Altino
Mucian
Peregrina Mogas Fontcuberta
Pope Leo II
Thomas the Apostle
July 3 (Eastern Orthodox liturgics)
Emancipation Day (United States Virgin Islands)
Independence Day, celebrates the liberation of Minsk from Nazi occupation by Soviet troops in 1944 (Belarus)
 The start of the Dog Days according to the Old Farmer's Almanac but not according to established meaning in most European cultures
 Women's Day (Myanmar)

References

External links

 
 
 

Days of the year
July